Marcus Henry Bland was an English merchant who founded the Bland Line in Gibraltar in 1810.

The business started as a small shipping agency, but later expanded into carrying supplies for the military garrison on the Rock. It was bought by Joseph and Emmanuel Gaggero in 1891.

References

External links 
http://gibraltar-intro.blogspot.co.uk/2015/02/1810-bland-line-reputable-tavern-owner.html
https://issuu.com/copywriteadvertising/docs/200year_brochure

English merchants
English emigrants to Gibraltar
Bland Group